Aerenicopsis hubrichi is a species of beetle in the family Cerambycidae. It was described by Carlos Bruch in 1925.

References

Aerenicini
Beetles described in 1925